The phrase Imperial and Royal, typically abbreviated as , ,  in German (the  is always spoken unabbreviated),  in Hungarian,  in Czech,  in Polish,  in Slovenian,  in Croatian,  in Serbian, and  in Italian, refers to the court/government of the Habsburgs in a broader historical perspective. Some modern authors restrict its use to the Dual Monarchy of Austria-Hungary from 1867 to 1918. 

The acts of the common government, which was responsible only for the Imperial & Royal ("I&R") Ministry of Foreign Affairs, the I&R Ministry of War and the I&R Ministry of Finance (financing only the two other ministries), were carried out in the name of "His Imperial and Royal Majesty", and the central governmental bodies had their names prefixed with

Before 1867, the territories under the control of the Habsburg monarch in Vienna used  or the hyphenated  interchangeably. Neither of the spellings defined a hierarchy among the Habsburg dynastic kingdoms, principalities, duchies, and other bodies politic. The Habsburg monarchs ruled the kingdoms of Hungary, Croatia and Bohemia as their Kings. The title Emperor applied to their role as heads of the conglomerate of the mostly German states called the Holy Roman Empire until 1806. The same title, Emperor, came to identify their role as rulers of the newly named Austrian Empire that the Habsburgs attributed so from 11 August 1804.

The name "Imperial-Royal Army" was used from 1745, as "Royal" referred to the Apostolic Kingdom of Hungary, which was not part of the Holy Roman Empire, but under Habsburg rule.

Use of the phrase  was decreed in a letter written by the Emperor on October 17, 1889 for the military, the navy and the institutions shared by both parts of the empire. Subsequently, the abbreviation  only referred to the institutions of the "Austrian" part of Austria-Hungary (Cisleithania).

In official documents, the abbreviation used provides information on the lands targeted:
 , meaning "imperial (Austria) and royal (Hungary)", pertains to the Austro-Hungarian Empire 1867–1918

Other uses 

The ubiquity of this phrase in all administrative matters made it a synonym for the Habsburg administration, sometimes referred to as the " monarchy" in Central European publications through the present.

It was intended to describe the Habsburg Monarchy as a state of mind, bureaucratic and with a highly stratified formal society. A discussion of Kakania became a highlight of the first volume of Robert Musil's novel The Man Without Qualities (1930).

See also 
 Purveyors to the Imperial and Royal Court of Austria-Hungary; The term was also applied to companies supplying the Royal Austrian court.
 Imperial-Royal
 
 Hackle
 King-Emperor

References 

Austria-Hungary
German words and phrases